M.U. – The Best of Jethro Tull, released in 1976, is the first proper greatest hits album by Jethro Tull. It spans the years 1969 to 1975. The earlier Living in the Past (1972) compilation mainly dealt with non-album material, but this album only features one previously unreleased song, "Rainbow Blues".

"M.U." in the album title stood for "Musician's Union", which is probably a reference to the various musicians from different line-ups of the band appearing throughout the album.

It was later re-released as The Essential in 2003, with exactly the same song order, but a different album cover.

Track listing 
Side one
 "Teacher" (A, C, E, G, M) – 4:07 (alternative mix)
 "Aqualung" (C, E, H, I, J) – 6:34 (alternative mix, including the song's opening guitar riff played twice - previous US edits of the song began three seconds later, with the second playing of the riff)
 "Thick as a Brick Edit #1" (B, E, H, M, R) – 3:01 (The first three minutes of "Thick as a Brick, Part One")
 "Bungle in the Jungle" (B, E, H, M, R) – 3:34
 "Locomotive Breath" (C, E, H, I, J) – 4:23 (alternate mix)

Side two
 "Fat Man" (A, C, M) – 2:50
 "Living in the Past" (C, G, U) – 3:18
 "A Passion Play Edit #8" (B, E, H, M, R) – 3:28 ("Overseer Overture", which occurs about 8 minutes into "A Passion Play, Part Two")
 "Skating Away on the Thin Ice of the New Day" (B, E, H, M) – 4:02
 "Rainbow Blues" (B, E, H, M, R) – 3:37
 "Nothing is Easy" (A, C, G, M) – 4:23

Personnel 
As mentioned and sorted on the back cover:
 Ian Anderson – flute, acoustic guitar, soprano saxophone, mandolin and voice
 Martin Barre – electric guitar and acoustic guitar
 (E) John Evan – piano, hammond organ, synthesizer and piano accordion
 (G) Glenn Cornick – bass guitar
 (H) Jeffrey Hammond – bass guitar
 (C) Clive Bunker – drums and percussion
 (B) Barriemore Barlow – drums and percussion
 (M) Recorded at Morgan Studios, London
 (I) Recorded at Island Studios, London
 (U) Recorded at Vantone Studio, West Orange, New Jersey
 (R) Engineered by Robin Black
 (J) Engineered by John Burns
 (A) Engineered by Andy Johns
 (P) 1972, 1973, 1974 and 1975 Chrysalis Records

Production by Ian Anderson and Terry Ellis.
Orchestrations arranged and conducted by Dee Palmer.

Art direction by OZ Studios.
Designed by Eric Michelson.

Charts

Certifications

References

External links 
 M.U. - The Best of Jethro Tull (1976) album review by Stephen Thomas Erlewine, credits & releases at AllMusic.com
 M.U. - The Best of Jethro Tull (1976) album releases & credits at Discogs.com
 M.U. - The Best of Jethro Tull (1976) album credits & user reviews at ProgArchives.com
 M.U. - The Best of Jethro Tull (1976) album to be listened as stream at Play.Spotify.com

1976 greatest hits albums
Jethro Tull (band) compilation albums
Chrysalis Records compilation albums